Jakob Nielsen (8 June 1900 – 4 April 1979) was a Danish actor. He appeared in more than 45 films between 1937 and 1976.

Selected filmography
 Life on the Hegn Farm (1938)
 Those Blasted Kids (1947)
 Det Sande Ansigt (1951)
 The Son (1953)
 The Crime of Tove Andersen (1953)
 Der kom en dag (1955)
 Vagabonderne på Bakkegården (1958)
 Paradise and Back (1964)
 Hejrenæs (1953)

References

External links

1900 births
1979 deaths
Danish male film actors
People from Frederiksberg